Maxwell Hill is a town located in the province of Christ Church, Barbados. Maxwell Hill is also a shipping point where crops and sugar in nearby plantations are exported to other parts of the country.

References 

Populated places in Barbados